Sungkonghoe University is a private university in Seoul, South Korea. It was originally founded in 1914 by an Anglican Communion and became a comprehensive university in 1994. It is one of the most progressive universities in South Korea with an academic mission dedicated to the promotion of human rights, democracy, and peace on the Korean peninsula. It is particularly respected in the research and education of social sciences.

History

Origins (1914–1960) 
St. Michael's Seminary was founded in 1914 laying the groundwork for what would become, in 1994, Sungkonghoe University.  The current rector is the Rev. KwonSeok Yang, an Anglican priest and a theologian.

Development (1961–1994)

Expansion (1994–present) 
The school has been an active member of CUAC (Colleges and Universities of Anglican Communion) since it joined in 1995.  In 1999 it became a member of the Democracy Consortium of Universities with Sang-ji University and Han-shin University in 1999.

Academics

Undergraduate 
 College of Social Sciences (Majors - Political science, Economics, Sociology, Social Welfare, Business administration)
 College of Humanities
 College of Media and Digital Content
 College of Information Technology Engineering
 College of General education

Postgraduate 
 Graduate School of Social Sciences 
 Graduate School of Theology
 Graduate School of Education
 Graduate School of Social Welfare
 Graduate School of Peace and Civil society
 Graduate School of Culture and Communications
 Graduate School of Social and Solidarity Economy

Research centers 
 Institute for East Asian Studies (EAI)
 Democracy and Social Movements Institute (DaSM)
 Research Center for Social Enterprise

Notable people 
 Shin Youngbok, Philosopher
 Lee Jae-joung, Theologian, Member of Parliament, Minister of Unification, Superintendent of Education(Gyeonggi-do)
 Cho Hee-yeon, Sociologist, Superintendent of Education(Seoul)
 Jung Hae-Gu, Political scientist, Chairperson of the National Research Council for Economics, Humanities and Social Sciences.
 Kim Dong-choon, Sociologist
 KIM Soohaeng, Economist
 Nam In-soon, Member of Parliament
 Mohiuddin Ahmad, writer and researcher, taught at the university.

See also
Rikkyo University
List of universities and colleges in South Korea
Onsu station

References

External links
The Official website
Comprehensive Information System
Main Library of SKHU

Coordinates on Wikidata
Universities and colleges in Seoul
Anglican universities and colleges
Educational institutions established in 1914
1914 establishments in Korea
Guro District, Seoul